M.J. Bale is a multi-channel Australian menswear and fashion label launched in 2009 by founder Matt Jensen. M.J. Bale's aesthetic specialises in tailored suiting, casual wear and menswear accessories with an urban design edge.

References

External links
 

Australian tailors
Clothing brands of Australia
Clothing retailers of Australia
Australian brands
Australian fashion
High fashion brands
Australian companies established in 2009
Retail companies established in 2009
Companies based in Sydney
Luxury brands